Newcomb is a lunar impact crater that is located in the rugged Montes Taurus mountain range, to the east of the Mare Serenitatis. It lies to the northeast of the prominent crater Römer, and north-northwest of Macrobius.

This crater has a sharp-edged and somewhat irregular rim that appears polygonal more than circular. There are terraces along the inner sides, with some slumping along the northern and western inner edge. The south-southwestern part of the rim is overlaid by the smaller crater Newcomb A. The interior floor is uneven, particularly near the rim of Newcomb A. Just to the south-southeast of the crater is the satellite crater Newcomb J. This feature is named after the American astronomer Simon Newcomb.

Satellite craters
By convention these features are identified on lunar maps by placing the letter on the side of the crater midpoint that is closest to Newcomb.

See also 
 Asteroid 855 Newcombia
 Newcomb (Martian crater)

References

 
 
 
 
 
 
 
 
 
 
 

Impact craters on the Moon